St Mel's College is an all-boys secondary school in Longford, Ireland.

History
The college opened in September 1865 with 48 boarders and 20 dayboys. The architect was Than  Ourke with a total cost of 16,000 euro. In the beginning, it was actually a seminary, where students studied to become priests. Fr. James Reynolds was the first president. Previously he had been Superior of St Mel's Day School in the Market Square. The school shares its name with St Mel's Cathedral in Longford and it is situated to the rear of the cathedral. The cathedral and the college are named after Saint Mél of Ardagh.

St Mel's was originally a boarding school since its foundation, later becoming a day school. Due to financial implications and decreasing demand for boarding schools it stopped taking in boarders in the early 2000s.

Sports
St Mel's won its first All Ireland Senior Final, beating St Patrick's College, Cavan in Croke Park by 4-7 to 3-3. The college has won the All Ireland Schools Gaelic football championship the Hogan Cup in 1948, 1962, 1963, and 1987 (they also were runners-up in 1961 and 1988). They hold the record for the most wins, 29, in the Leinster Colleges Senior Football Championship.  St Mel's have an all-weather pitch provided by PST Sport. In February 2020, it was announced that Longford Athletics Club and the College would build an Indoor facility on the college grounds.

Past pupils

 Micheál Carrigy, Senator elected 2020
 Conor Connelly (1975–2020), Gaelic footballer 
 James Patrick Farrell (1865–1921), Nationalist MP for Cavan 1895–1900 and North Longford 1900–1918
 Ray Flynn (b. 1957), athlete
 Rev. Joseph Guinan (1863–1932), priest, teacher (at St Mel's) and novelist
 John Leydon (1895–1979), civil servant, involved in setting up Aer Lingus, IMI and IPA
 Pádraic McCormack, former TD for Galway West and Senator
 Bishop James Moynagh S.P.S. (1903–1985), missionary priest and bishop to Nigeria
 Liam Mulvihill, former director general of the GAA
 Declan Nerney, Irish country singer
 Ruairí Ó Brádaigh, Former TD (1957–1961), President of Sinn Fein (1970–1983), President of Republican Sinn Féin (1987–2009)
 Bishop Colm O'Reilly, Bishop of the Roman Catholic Diocese of Ardagh and Clonmacnoise
 John Wilson (1923–2007), TD for Cavan Monaghan and government minister

References

External links
St Mel's College website

1865 establishments in Ireland
Educational institutions established in 1865
Longford (town)
Secondary schools in County Longford